Benny or Bennie is a given name or a shortened version of the given name Benjamin or, less commonly, Benedict, Bennett, Benito, Benson, Bernice, Ebenezer or Bernard.

People

Bennie

Given name
Bennie M. Bunn (1907–1943), American Marine officer, Navy Cross recipient
Bennie Cunningham (born 1954), American retired National Football League player
 Bennie Daniels (born 1932), American former Major League Baseball pitcher
 Bennie L. Davis (1928–2012), United States Air Force general and commander-in-chief of Strategic Air Command
 Bennie Ellender (1925–2011), American college football player and head coach
 Bennie Goods (born 1968), American retired Canadian Football League player
 Bennie Green (1923–1977), American jazz trombonist and bandleader
 Bennie Logan (born 1989), American National Football League player
 Bennie Maupin (born 1940), American jazz musician
 Bennie Muller (born 1948), Dutch former footballer
 Bennie Purcell (born 1929), American college basketball and Washington Generals (Harlem Globetrotters) player and college tennis coach
 Bennie Thompson (born 1948), American politician
 Bennie Thompson (American football) (born 1963), American retired National Football League player
 Bennie Wallace (born 1946), American post bop, swing music and jazz tenor saxophonist and composer

Surname
 Bob Bennie (footballer, born 1873) (1873–1945), Scottish footballer with St Mirren and Newcastle (uncle of two following)
 Peter Bennie (1899–1981), Scottish footballer with Albion Rovers, Burnley, Bradford City 
 Bob Bennie (1900–1972), Scottish footballer with Third Lanark, Airdrieonians, Hearts
 Bennie Railplane, invented by George Bennie

Benny
 Göran Bror Benny Andersson (born 1946), Swedish musician and member of the pop group ABBA
 Benny Davis (1895–1979), vaudeville performer
 Benny Davis, member of the musical comedy trio The Axis of Awesome
 Benny Dayal (born 1984), a UAE- Indian playback singer for films
 Benny Feilhaber (born 1985), Brazilian/American soccer player
 Benny Friedman (singer) (born 1985), American Hasidic Jewish singer
 Benny Gantz, Israeli Chief of the General Staff and politician
 Benny Giay (born 1955), Indonesian Christian theologian, social anthropologist and human rights activist
 Benny Goldberg (1918–2001), Polish-American boxer
 Benny Hill (1924–1992), stage name of British comedian and actor Alfred Hawthorne Hill
 Benny Johnson (American football) (1948–1988), American National Football League player
 Benny Krueger (1899–1967), American jazz saxophonist
 Benny Lindelauf (born 1964), Dutch writer
 Benny Moré (1919–1963), Cuban singer and musician
 Benny Nielsen (swimmer) (born 1966), Danish butterfly swimmer
 Benny Rubinstein, Israeli footballer
 Benny Cederfeld de Simonsen (1865–1952), Danish peace activist
 Benny Snell (born 1998), American football player
 Benny Spellman (1931–2011), American R&B singer
 Benny Urquidez (born 1952), American kickboxer and fight choreographer
 Benny Yau (born 1980), Canadian actor and television presenter
 Marco Benny Benassi also known as Benny Benassi, Italian musician

Benjamin
 Bennie McRae (1939–2012), American National Football League player
 Bennie Moten (1894–1935), American jazz pianist and bandleader
 Bennie Oosterbaan (1906–1990), American college football, basketball and baseball player and head coach
 Benny Bass (1904–1975), American Hall-of-Fame world champion featherweight and junior lightweight boxer
 Benny Begin (born 1943), Israeli politician
 Benny Friedman (1905–1982), American football quarterback, member of the Pro Football Hall-of-Fame
 Benny Goodman (1909–1986), American jazz clarinetist and bandleader
 Benny Leonard (1896–1947), American world champion Hall-of-Fame lightweight boxer born Benjamin Leiner
 Benny Parsons (1941–2007), American NASCAR driver and color commentator

Other
 Horacio Benedict Bennie Blades (born 1966), American retired National Football League player
 Bernhard Bennie Borgmann (1900–1978), pioneering professional basketball player and head coach
 Henry Bennett Bennie Tate (1901–1973), American Major League Baseball catcher
 Bennett Benny Carter (1907–2003), American jazz musician and bandleader
 Bernard Benny Gallagher (born 1945), Scottish singer-songwriter and half of the duo Gallagher and Lyle
 Jergen Benny Nielsen (footballer, born 17 March 1951) (born 1951), Danish footballer

Fictional characters
 Benny, a squirrel in 2006 Disney animated film The Wild
 Benny the Bull, in the children's animated television series Dora the Explorer
 Benny the Cab, who first appeared in Who Framed Roger Rabbit
 Benny Shaw, protagonist in two children's novels by Irish author Eoin Colfer
 Bernice Summerfield, companion of the Seventh Doctor in the expanded Doctor Who universe
 Benny, a blue 1980s style spaceman from The Lego Movie.
Benny, the secondary antagonist of Fallout: New Vegas
 Benny Hawkins, character in Crossroads (British TV series) (played by Paul Henry)

See also 
 Beny (disambiguation)

Masculine given names
Hypocorisms